Lahore Canal (Urdu/Punjabi: لاہور نہر) begins at the Bambawali-Ravi-Bedian (BRB) Canal that runs through the east of the city of Lahore, Punjab in Pakistan. It was then upgraded by the British in 1861. It is an important part of the city's cultural heritage.

The canal is managed by Lahore Zone of the Punjab Irrigation Department. The canal, aside from its importance in irrigation purposes, forms the centre of a unique linear park that serves as one of the longest public green belts and popular recreational destination spots. On local and national festivals, the canal is illuminated with lights and décor.

Construction
The Bambawali Ravi-Bedian (BRB) Canal at the east of the city of Lahore was already constructed in Mughal Era, however, during the British Raj,  the British sliced the Bambawali-Ravi-Bedian (BRB) Canal and extended it on the west side (city of Lahore) till the town of Raiwind, located in south of Lahore.

The idea to extend the canal may have possibly emerged because an irrigation system was felt necessary after a disastrous famine hit the Subcontinent in 1837-38 in which nearly ten million (one crore) rupees was spent on relief works, resulting in considerable loss of revenue to the British East India Company.

Route

It starts from BRB canal, few yards away from the Khaira Village, dividing the old neighborhoods of Lahore (on the west-side of the Canal) from the trendy areas of the privileged rich (on the east side of the Canal). Metrobus (Lahore) also crosses it through a flyover on the way. Muslim Town Flyover is also present over the canal. After crossing the Thokar Niaz Baig, it turns left and moves parallel to the Raiwind road. Flowing between the main highways, the canal also serves as the chief artery of the city.

Culture and arts

The canal is an important part of Lahore's culture. During summers, its very sight is a relief to the Lahoris. In those hot, simmering days hundreds of people come to swim. They eat watermelons and generally have good time in the canal. Young boys make the crowd but in the evenings one sees a good number of families sitting on the banks, the women with their feet in the water.

On local, national and religious festivals, such as Jashn-e-Baharan (the welcoming of spring), Basant, Eid, Pakistan's Independence Day and Pakistan Day the canal is illuminated with lights and different types of décor are laid out into the water - relevant to the festival. Many companies like OMORÉ have also used the canal as a great way to promote their brand.

Problems

Unhealthy water
The canal water is said to be toxic and unhygienic. The samples of the canal water were examined at the Environment Department’s specialized laboratory in Lahore and showed “excessive limits of sulfide, biochemical oxygen demand, chemical oxygen demand (COD), total dissolved solids, total suspended solids, chlorine and sulphate; a disturbed pH balance and several other imbalances” because of the chemicals being thrown into the canal. The report found that all of the pollutants were in excess of the limit set by national environment quality standards.  Regrettably, lower-class citizens swim in that water and some even drink from it, oblivious to the fact that this polluted water can cause diseases like hepatitis and various skin diseases.

Desiltation
In early 2008, water was stopped from flowing into the canal to carry out de-silting and cleaning up any mess from the canal-bed. Cranes were seen digging out all the mud and filling truck-loads on the canal banks.

After the process has been completed and the canal bed looks beautifully uniform, the irrigation officials let the water flow again on February 10, 2008.

The canal is de-silted annually by the Punjab Irrigation in the closure months of December and January.

Criticism of government
Lahore Bachao Tehreek’s (Save Lahore Movement) case against the widening of the Lahore Canal was still pending before the Supreme Court. Up till now, no steps had been taken to purify the waters of the canal, seeing that political and public interests were being mixed and the country’s rulers were not bothered about the issue at all. “The water in the canal is made to look clean and purified when VIPs have to go along the canal route, after which there is a return to the dismal conditions,” Dr Ijaz (Lahore Conservation Society Information Secretary) said, adding that the government was not sincerely concerned about the welfare of its people and was exposing them to the harmful water of the canal. Mustansar Hussain Tarar and others have criticized the road-widening project in Express News documentary film Bahao.

Developmental projects

Swimming areas
Plans have been brought to convert parts of the canal into a proper swimming area. Experts believe that the plan will have a positive impact on the lifestyle of the citizens who have been deprived of any such facility for a long time. Under the proposed plan, the government will stop the flow of water for a few weeks to properly clean the basin of the Canal and design it to avoid any accidents. Stairs would be built in the Canal at different points with boards set up on sides mentioning the Canal’s depth to prohibit children from swimming in some places. Moreover, proper lifeguards, lifejackets, medical teams, swimming accessories and other required facilities would also be made available at the swimming points. Proper food stalls and greenery in sitting places with proper maintenance will also be ensured to entertain visitors who do not know how to swim.

The government will provide facilities at par with international standards, keeping in mind the domestic cultural norms at the same time. The facility will be provided on selected points depending on the depth of the Canal.  The Parks and Horticulture Authority (PHA) will be spearheading the plan while other departments including Tourism, Communication and Works and Irrigation will execute the proposed development work later. “We will develop a state-of-the-art facility for the public with a lot of trees, which will not only beautify the spots but improve the environmental condition of the historic city,” PHA Director General Dr Raheel Ahmad Siddiqui said.

Recreational picnic spots
The former Punjab Chief Minister Shahbaz Sharif had said that back in time, their government had paid special attention on the development of infrastructure including the development of picnic spots at the Lahore Canal. The former CM said that provision of recreational facilities was of paramount importance in the present age of stress and tension, therefore parks and playgrounds were being developed on priority basis. He said that recreational facilities of international standard would be made available at Jallo Park whereas attractive picnic spots would also be developed at the Lahore Canal.

References

External links
 BAHAAO A documentary on Lahore Canal Part 1
 Lahore – A Canal Runs Through It
 The canal — a blessing or a risk not worth taking?
 Water park idea at Lahore canal by Husain Qazi Sunday 2 August 2009
 ‘Custodian’ guilty of ‘dumping’ Canal By Afnan Khan
 On Lahore’s canal
 Lahore Canal Desilted by Hasan Mubarak (February 10th, 2008)
 Part of Lahore Canal to be swimming, picnic area
 Shahbaz for modern picnic spots along Lahore Canal

Canals in Lahore